Lower Subansiri district (Pron:/su:bənˈsɪɹi/) is one of the 25 administrative districts of the state of Arunachal Pradesh in northeastern India.

History
The district was formed when Subansiri district was bifurcated into Upper and Lower Subansiri districts in 1987. Lower Subansiri district has a long ancient history related with the Chutiya Kingdom. It was probably under Chutiya chieftain rule from a long time, and came under Birpal's rule in the 12th century.  In 1999 Papum Pare district was split to form new district, and this was repeated on 1 April 2001, with the creation of Kurung Kumey district.

In October 2017 the state government approved the creation of Kamle district, involving the carving out of Raga, Dolungmukh and Kumpurijio circles from Lower Subansiri district.

Geography
The district headquarters are located at Ziro. The district occupies an area of 3,460 km2.

It is bounded on the north by the Upper Subansiri district of Arunachal, on the south by Papum Pare District of Arunachal Pradesh and Assam, on the east by West Siang district and some part of Upper Subansiri, and on the west by East Kameng district of Arunachal Pradesh.

Divisions
There are 6 administrative circles in this district, namely, Ziro (Sadar), Yachuli, Pistana, Raga, Kamporijo and Dollungmukh. The district also divided into 3 blocks: Ziro-I, Ziro-II, and Tamen-Raga.

There are 2 Arunachal Pradesh Legislative Assembly constituencies located in this district: Yachuli and Ziro-Hapoli. Both of these are part of Arunachal West Lok Sabha constituency.

Demographics

According to the 2011 census Lower Subansiri district has a population of 83,030, roughly equal to the nation of Andorra. This gives it a ranking of 623rd in India (out of a total of 640). Its population growth rate over the decade 2001–2011 was 48.65%. Lower Subansiri has a sex ratio of 975 females for every 1000 males, and a literacy rate of 76.33%.

This district is inhabited by Nyishis and Apatanis.

Languages
Languages used in the district include Apatani, Nyishi language.

Culture
Major local festivals of the district are Nyokum, Boori-Boot Yullo, and Dree Festival.

Flora and fauna

References

External links
 Official website

 
Districts of Arunachal Pradesh
Minority Concentrated Districts in India
1987 establishments in Arunachal Pradesh